Ballybritt is a barony in County Offaly (formerly King's County), Republic of Ireland.

Etymology
Ballybritt derives its name from Ballybritt Castle (near Roscrea) and the townland of Ballybritt (Irish Baile an Bhriotaigh, "settlement of the Welshman").

Location

Ballybritt is located in south County Offaly, west of the Slieve Bloom Mountains.

History
Ballybritt was included in the northern part of the territory of the Éile (Ely), and in early times was a crossroads for the ancient borders of the kingdoms of Mumu, Mide and Laigin.

List of settlements

Below is a list of settlements in Ballybritt:
Birr
Cadamstown
Clareen
Crinkill
Kinnitty

References

Baronies of County Offaly